McAvoy is an Irish surname. Notable people with the surname include:

 Alex McAvoy (1928–2005), Scottish actor
 Andy McAvoy (born 1979), English footballer 
 Billy McAvoy, Northern Irish footballer 
 Charlie McAvoy (born 1997), American ice hockey defenseman
 Ciara McAvoy, Scottish artist
 Doug McAvoy (1939–2019), British trade union leader
 Doug McAvoy (footballer) (1918–1988), Scottish footballer 
 Dylan McAvoy, fictional character from The Young and the Restless
 Francis S. McAvoy (1856–1926), American jurist
 Frank McAvoy (1875–?), Scottish professional footballer 
 George McAvoy (baseball) (1884–1952), American baseball player
 George McAvoy (born 1931), Canadian ice hockey player 
 Gerry McAvoy (born 1951), Northern Ireland guitarist
 Jack McAvoy, American football coach
 James McAvoy (born 1979), Scottish actor
 Jess McAvoy, Australian musician
 Jock McAvoy (1908–1971), British boxer
 John McAvoy (disambiguation)
 May McAvoy (1899–1984), American actress
 Michael McAvoy (1871–1950), Scottish footballer with Darwen and St Mirren 
 Nathan McAvoy (born 1976), English rugby league player
 Thomas C. MacAvoy (1928-2015), Former president of the Boy Scouts of America (BSA)
 Thomas James McAvoy (born 1938), American jurist
 Tom McAvoy (1936–2011), baseball pitcher
 Tommy McAvoy (born 1943), Scottish politician
 Tony McAvoy, first Indigenous Australian QC and presenter of the 2021 Dr Charles Perkins Oration
 R. A. MacAvoy, American author
 Walter C. McAvoy (1904-1990), American politician
 Wickey McAvoy (1894–1973), American professional baseball player
 William H. McAvoy, aviator
 William McAvoy (1884–1956), American college sports coach

See also
 McEvoy

References